Lene Rubinstein is Professor of Ancient History at Royal Holloway, University of London. Her research centres on Greek history, especially Ancient Greek law and Greek inscriptions, as well as the Attic orators and oratory generally.

Education and career

She is a co-founder and a director of the Centre for Oratory and Rhetoric at the Department of Classics. She has publications on Athenian law and oratory and wrote a book "Litigation and Cooperation: Supporting Speakers in the Courts of Classical Athens" in 2000 on advocacy in the Athenian courts.

Selected publications
Immigration and Refugee Crises in Fourth-Century Greece: An Athenian Perspective, The European Legacy, 2018
Summary fines in Greek inscriptions and the question of Greek Law, Austin TX: University of Texas Press, 2018
From Antiphon to Autocue: Aspects of Speechwriting Ancient and Modern, Powell, J. G. F., Rubinstein, L. & Kremmydas, C. 2016 Stuttgart: Franz Steiner Verlag.
 Communal Revenge and Appeals to Dicastic Emotions, Franz Steiner Verlag, 2016.
Envoys and Ethos: team speaking by envoys in Classical Greece, Vandoeuvres: Entretiens du Fondation Hardt, 2016.
 Clauses out of Context: Partial Citation of Statutes in Attic Forensic Oratory, 2016.
Profession and Performance: Aspects of Oratory in the Greco-Roman World, Kremmydas, C. (ed.), Rubinstein, L. (ed.) & Powell, J. (ed.) 11 Oct 2013 London: Institute of Classical Studies. (Bulletin of the Institute of Classical Studies Supplement; vol. 123)
 Forgive and forget? Amnesty in the Hellenistic period, 2013.
 Spoken words, written submissions, and diplomatic conventions: The importance and impact of oral performance in Hellenistic inter-polis relations, 2013.
Greek History and Epigraphy: Essays in Honour of P. J. Rhodes, Rubinstein, L. (ed.) & Mitchell, L. (ed.) 2009 Swansea: Classical Press of Wales.
The Law and the Courts in Ancient Greece, Rubinstein, L. (ed.) & Harris, E. (ed.) 2004 London: Duckworth.
Litigation and Co-operation. The use of supporting speakers in the Courts of Classical Athens, Rubinstein, L. 2000 Stuttgart: F. Steiner Verlag. (Historia Einzelschriften; vol. 147)
Polis and Politics, Rubinstein, L. (ed.), Nielsen, T. H. (ed.) & Flensted-Jensen, P. (ed.) 2000 Copenhagen: Museum Tusculanum, University of Copenhagen.
Adoption in IV. Century Athens, Rubinstein, L. 1993 Copenhagen: Museum Tusculanum, University of Copenhagen. (Opuscula Graecolatina; vol. 34)

References

External links
http://royalholloway.academia.edu/LeneRubinstein

Academics of Royal Holloway, University of London
Living people
Year of birth missing (living people)